Russell County USD 407 is a public unified school district headquartered in Russell, Kansas, United States.  The district includes the communities of Russell, Bunker Hill, Gorham, Milberger, and nearby rural areas.

Schools

The school district operates the following schools:
 Russell High School (9-12)
 Ruppenthal Middle School (6-8)
 Bickerdyke Elementary School (2-5)
 Simpson Elementary School (K-1)

See also
 Kansas State Department of Education
 Kansas State High School Activities Association
 List of high schools in Kansas
 List of unified school districts in Kansas

References

External links
 

School districts in Kansas
Russell County, Kansas